The Swiss Alcohol Board (SAB) is a federal authority of the Swiss Confederation.

The SAB is responsible for the enforcement of the Swiss Alcohol Act, which governs the production and importation of spirits and ethanol, as well as trade in and advertising of spirits. The aim of this legislation is health protection (Art. 105 of the Swiss Federal Constitution). Fermented beverages, such as wine and beer, are not included in the scope of application of the Alcohol Act.

Aim and tasks 
The SAB fulfils tasks in the area of federal monopolies on the production of spirits and the production and importation of ethanol. Together with its partners in the cantons, it ensures compliance with the advertising and trade regulations applicable to spirits.

90% of its annual net profit of some CHF 260 million is allocated to AHV/IV financing and 10% to prevention projects (known as the "alcohol tenth").

Taxation of spirits 
The SAB's core task is to levy consumption tax on spirits at a rate of CHF 29 per litre of pure alcohol. To do this, it monitors consistent market separation between spirits and ethanol for consumption purposes and ethanol for industrial purposes, which is tax-free.

Advertising provisions 
The SAB ensures compliance with the advertising rules for spirits provided for in the Alcohol Act, which permit product-related advertising only. Portraying a certain lifestyle in relation to spirits is not permitted. It attaches great importance to providing advertising-specific advice. Prior to publication, advertising drafts can be checked free of charge for their compliance with the Alcohol Act on the SAB's own specially developed web portal.

Trade regulations 
The SAB issues permits for wholesale trade. A cantonal retail permit must be requested for selling and serving spirits to end customers. The cantons are responsible for the enforcement of trade regulations (e.g. prohibition of happy hour offers). The SAB provides advice to them in this area.

Protection of minors 
The provisions on the protection of minors are enshrined in the Alcohol Act and the Foodstuffs Act. It is forbidden to serve spirits to anyone under 18 or wine and beer to young people under 16. The cantons may also apply more stringent laws. For example, absolutely no alcoholic beverages are sold to anyone under 18 in the canton of Ticino. Clearly visible signs that specifically draw attention to the age restrictions must be installed at the points of sale. The SAB promotes mystery shopping, which has proved itself to be the most effective and economical tool for ensuring compliance with the age restrictions. It also provides free training materials for sales staff.

Importation of ethanol 
The tasks in the ethanol import monopoly area are performed by Alcosuisse. A profit centre with a performance mandate and global budget, it supplies Swiss businesses with some 40 million kilos of ethanol each year.

Organisation 
The SAB was founded in 1887 and is the Confederation's oldest institution. It has been a legal entity since 1900. The SAB is headquartered in Bern and runs two ethanol distribution centres in Schachen, Lucerne and Delémont, Jura. It performs inspections on a decentralised basis throughout Switzerland. The wide range of tasks performed by the SAB and its profit centre brings them into regular contact with over 135,000 companies, farms or individuals.

Restructuring (from 2008 onward) 
Under the partial revision of the Alcohol Act, the SAB is to be dissolved as an institution with its own legal identity and incorporated into the Federal Customs Administration (FCA). In the future, a new alcohol and tobacco division under the Directorate General of Customs (DGC) and headquartered in Delémont, Jura will be responsible for the enforcement of alcohol legislation. Alcosuisse, the SAB's profit centre, will be completely privatised.

External links 
 Official website of the Swiss Alcohol Board

Alcohol monopolies
Government agencies of Switzerland